Hendon Building Society was a UK building society, which was taken over by the Bradford & Bingley Building Society in 1991. Hendon Building Society was founded in 1938 as a mutual organization, which means that it was owned by its members rather than by shareholders. The society offered a range of financial products and services, including mortgages, savings accounts, and insurance, to customers in the local area. It has branches in London and the surrounding areas. Bradford & Bingley fell victim to the financial crisis of 2007–2010 and is now part of Santander UK, while its mortgage book is owned by UK Financial Investments Limited.

References

External links
Santander website